San Rocco Battery was an artillery battery in Kalkara, Malta, built by Maltese insurgents during the French blockade of 1798–1800. It was the last in a chain of batteries, redoubts and entrenchments encircling the French positions in Marsamxett and the Grand Harbour. It was built to control the entrance to the harbour as well as the French occupied Fort Ricasoli. The battery was continually being fired upon from the French at Ricasoli.

The battery was built on a low hillock and had two gun platforms, which were connected together with rubble walls. Around December 1799, a magazine was built by the architect Michele Cachia at the rear of the battery, with timber beams taken from ruined houses in Paola. The battery was initially armed with two 6-pounder iron guns. During the course of the siege, the armament was increased to five 12-pounders and two 8-pounders on the upper platform, while the lower platform was armed with four 32-pounders for coastal defence. By the end of the blockade in 1800 it had ten guns and two mortars. At one point, men from the 30th (Cambridgeshire) Regiment of Foot were stationed at San Rocco Battery.

In 1799, the British devised an evacuation plan in case a French relief force arrived. British forces were to gather at San Rocco Battery, and they were to retreat to Żabbar under the cover of San Rocco Redoubt. From there, they would retreat to Żejtun, and then to Fort Rohan under the cover of St. Lucian Redoubt. They would embark on their ships in Marsaxlokk Harbour and evacuate the island.

Like the other French blockade fortifications, San Rocco Battery was dismantled, possibly sometime after 1814. No traces of the battery can be seen today. In the 1870s, the British built Fort Saint Rocco on the site of the battery.

References

Batteries in Malta
Kalkara
Military installations established in 1798
Demolished buildings and structures in Malta
French occupation of Malta
Vernacular architecture in Malta
Limestone buildings in Malta
1798 establishments in Malta
18th-century fortifications
18th Century military history of Malta